Chandigarh Baptist School is a co-educational senior secondary private school in Chandigarh, India

History
Founded in 1986 by a non-governmental organisation, North West India Baptist Association, as a pre-school, it was elevated to the upper-primary school in 1993, and in 2001 to the secondary school. In 2007, it was further upgraded to the senior secondary level educational institution.

The school is administered by North West India Baptist Association and is affiliated to Central Board of Secondary Education, New Delhi, India. The school has close to 1,200 in attendance.

See also
Education in India
Chandigarh

References

External links

Co-educational schools in India
Christian schools in Chandigarh
Private schools in Chandigarh
Educational institutions established in 1986
1986 establishments in Chandigarh